Theresia Maria “Therese” Zenz (15 October 1932 – 22 October 2019) was a Saar-born German sprint canoer. She took part in the 1952, 1956 and 1960 Olympics and won three silver medals for the United Team of Germany in 1956 and 1960. At the 1952 games she competed for Saar and finished ninth in the K-1 500 metres event. She later became a coach for the West German team.

Zenz won three medals at the ICF Canoe Sprint World Championships with a gold (K-1 500 m: 1954 for Saar) and two bronzes (K-1 500 m and K-2 500 m: both 1958 for West Germany).

References

Therese Zenz's profile at Sports Reference.com
Therese Zenz's obituary

1932 births
2019 deaths
People from Merzig-Wadern
Canoeists at the 1952 Summer Olympics
Canoeists at the 1956 Summer Olympics
Canoeists at the 1960 Summer Olympics
West German female canoeists
Olympic canoeists of Saar
Olympic canoeists of the United Team of Germany
Olympic silver medalists for the United Team of Germany
Olympic medalists in canoeing
Medalists at the 1956 Summer Olympics
Medalists at the 1960 Summer Olympics
ICF Canoe Sprint World Championships medalists in kayak
Sportspeople from Saarland